Siskiwitia is a genus of moth in the family Cosmopterigidae.

Species
Siskiwitia alticolans Hodges, 1969
Siskiwitia falcata Hodges, 1978
Siskiwitia latebra Hodges, 1978

References
Natural History Museum Lepidoptera genus database

Chrysopeleiinae